This page is a list of heirs to the Belgian throne. The list includes all individuals who were considered to inherit the throne of Belgium, either as heir apparent or as heir presumptive. Those who succeeded as King or Queen of the Belgians are shown in bold.

List of heirs

See also
Line of succession to the Belgian throne

References

Belgian monarchy
Belgium
Belgium
Heirs to the Belgian throne